Henrique Tomassini (April 1899 – 13 June 1975) was a Brazilian rower. He competed in the men's double sculls event at the 1932 Summer Olympics.

References

External links
 

1899 births
1975 deaths
Brazilian male rowers
Olympic rowers of Brazil
Rowers at the 1932 Summer Olympics
Rowers from Rio de Janeiro (city)